Yuriy Kryvoruchko may refer to :

 Yuriy Kryvoruchko (born 1986), Ukrainian chess player
 Yuriy Kryvoruchko (politician) (born 1966), Ukrainian activist, People's Deputy of Ukraine of 3rd and 4th convocation